The 20819/20820 Puri–Okha Dwarka Express is a superfast train belonging to Indian Railways that runs between  and  in India. It is currently operated with 20819/20820 train numbers on a weekly basis.

Coach composition

The train has standard LHB coaches with max speed of 110 kmph. The train consists of 22 coaches :

 1 AC II Tier
 5 AC III Tier
 8 Sleeper coaches
 5 General Unreserved
 2 Seating cum Luggage Rake
 1 Pantry Car

Service

Routes & Halts

The important halts of the train are:

 
 
 
 
 
 
 
 
 
 
 
 
 
 
 
 
 
 
 
 
 
 
 
 

Train reverses its direction 3 times at:

Schedule

Traction

It is hauled by a Visakhapatnam-based WAP-4 locomotive from Puri till Ahmedabad Junction after which a Vatva-based WDM-3A locomotive hauls the train for the remainder of its journey until 
Okha.

References

External links
20819 Dwarka Express at India Rail Info
20820 Dwarka Express at India Rail Info

Transport in Okha
Transport in Puri
Express trains in India
Rail transport in Gujarat
Rail transport in Maharashtra
Rail transport in Andhra Pradesh
Rail transport in Odisha
Railway services introduced in 1994
Rail transport in Telangana